Beilschmiedia obtusifolia is a rainforest tree in the laurel family Lauraceae, found in rainforests of eastern Australia and also in New Guinea. In Australia it ranges from Port Macquarie in New South Wales northwards to Cape York Peninsula in Queensland, within tropical and sub tropical rainforests, usually on the more fertile basaltic sites, but sometimes close to the sea. Its common names include blush walnut, hard bolly gum, and nut wood.

Description 
A medium to large tree. The cylindrical trunk is brown or creamy with vertical lines of raised pustules. The trunk features scales with round depressions, colloquially known as "bollies", similar to the related Bollygum, Litsea reticulata. The tree's base is flanged in larger specimens.

Shoots and stems hairy. The elliptic or reverse lanceolate shaped leaves are alternate and not toothed, 8 to 10 cm long and 2 to 4 cm wide. Bluntly pointed or sometimes notched at the tip. Leaf stalks 5 mm long. Leaf venation is prominent on both sides, with a raised midrib.

Cream flowers form in panicles from October to November, the flowers have an unpleasant scent. The fruit ripens December to July, being a black egg shaped drupe with a scented green oily aril. 20 to 30 mm long with a single seed inside. As with most Australian laurels, removal of the fleshy aril is advised to assist seed germination, which is slow but fairly reliable with Beilschmiedia obtusifolia.

The fruits are eaten by a variety of birds, including the pied imperial pigeon, rose-crowned fruit dove, topknot pigeon, wompoo fruit dove, metallic starling, Australasian figbird, magnificent riflebird, bowerbird, and spotted catbird.

References
 
 

Flora of New South Wales
Flora of Queensland
Laurales of Australia
obtusifolia
Trees of Australia
Taxa named by Ferdinand von Mueller
Taxa named by Carl Meissner